Moundville Archaeological Site, also known as the Moundville Archaeological Park, is a Mississippian culture archaeological site on the Black Warrior River in Hale County, near the modern city of Tuscaloosa, Alabama. Extensive archaeological investigation has shown that the site was the political and ceremonial center of a regionally organized Mississippian culture chiefdom polity between the 11th and 16th centuries. The archaeological park portion of the site is administered by the University of Alabama Museums and encompasses , consisting of 29 platform mounds around a rectangular plaza.

The site was declared a National Historic Landmark in 1964 and was added to the National Register of Historic Places in 1966.

Moundville is the second-largest site in the United States of the classic Middle Mississippian era, after Cahokia in Illinois. The culture was expressed in villages and chiefdoms throughout the central Mississippi River Valley, the lower Ohio River Valley, and most of the Mid-South area, including Kentucky, Tennessee, Alabama, and Mississippi as the core of the classic Mississippian culture area. The park contains a museum and an archaeological laboratory.

History 
Moundville was mentioned by E. G. Squier and Edwin Hamilton Davis in their work, Ancient Monuments of the Mississippi Valley (c1848), a survey conducted for the Smithsonian Institution. Later in the century, Nathaniel Thomas Lupton created a fairly accurate map of the site.

Little excavation work was conducted at Moundville by the Bureau of Ethnology's Division of Mound Exploration, partly because the landowner imposed a fee. The first significant archaeological investigations were not conducted until the early 20th century, by Clarence Bloomfield Moore, a lawyer from Philadelphia. He dug extensively at Moundville in 1906, and his detailed records of his work and finds have been of use to modern archaeologists. But looters dug into the mounds over the next two decades and took many artifacts, in addition to destroying stratigraphy of some structures.

In the mid-1920s concerned citizens, including Walter B. Jones (geologist) (after whom the site's museum is named) had begun a concerted effort to save the site. With the help of the Alabama Museum of Natural History, they purchased the land containing the mounds. By 1933 the site had officially become known as Mound State Park, but the park was not developed for visitors until 1938. During this period of the Great Depression, workers of the Civilian Conservation Corps were  brought in to stabilize the mounds against erosion. They also constructed roads and buildings to allow public uses at the site. The name of the park was changed to Mound State Monument and was opened to the public in 1939.

During a 1980 break-in at the Erskine Ramsay Archaeological Repository at Moundville, 264 pottery vessels, one-fifth of the vessel collection curated by the Alabama Museum of Natural History, were stolen. The highest-quality specimens were taken. Despite an investigation by the Federal Bureau of Investigation, none of the artifacts was seen again until 2018 when three ceremonial bowls were anonymously returned.

In 1991, the park's name was officially changed to Moundville Archaeological Park. In November 2021, the Native American Graves Protection and Repatriation Review Committee found the site to be culturally linked to the seven Muskogean-speaking tribes who have petitioned for the return of 5,982 human remains and funerary objects.

Site

The site was occupied by Native Americans of the Mississippian culture from around 1000 AD to 1450 AD. Around 1150 AD the settlement's leaders began their rise from a local to a regional center, known as a chiefdom. At its height, the community took the form of a roughly  residential and political area, protected on three sides by a bastioned wooden palisade wall. The remaining side was protected by the river bluff.

The largest platform mounds were built on the northern edge of the plaza; they become increasingly smaller going either clockwise or counter clockwise around the plaza to the south. Scholars theorize that the highest-ranking clans occupied the large northern mounds, with the smaller mounds' supporting buildings used for residences, mortuary, and other purposes. A total of 29 mounds remain on the site.

Of the two largest mounds in the group, Mound A occupies a central position in the great plaza, and Mound B lies just to the north. It is a steep, -tall pyramidal mound with two access ramps. Archaeologists have also found evidence at the site of borrow pits, other public buildings, and a dozen small houses constructed of pole and thatch.

Archaeologists have interpreted this community plan as a sociogram, an architectural depiction of a social order based on ranked clans. According to this model, the Moundville community was segmented into a variety of different clan precincts, the ranked positions of which were represented in the size and arrangement of paired earthen mounds around the central plaza. By 1300, the site was being used more as a religious and political center than as a residential town. This signaled the beginning of a decline, and by 1500 most of the area was abandoned.

Population 

The surrounding area appears to have been densely populated, but the people built relatively few mounds before AD 1200, after which the public architecture of the plaza and mounds was constructed. At its height, the population is estimated to have been around 1,000 to 3,000 people within the walls, with 10,000 additional people in the surrounding river valley.

Based on findings during excavations, the residents of the site were skilled in agriculture, especially the cultivation of maize. Production of maize surpluses gave the people time produce to trade for other goods, supported population density, and allowed craft specialization. Extensive amounts of imported luxury goods, such as copper, mica, galena, and marine shell, have been excavated from the site. The site is renowned by scholars for the artistic excellence of its artifacts of pottery, stonework, and embossed copper left by the former residents.

Excavations and interpretation 

The first major excavations were done in 1905-06 by Clarence Bloomfield Moore, an independent archeologist, before archaeology had become a professional field of scholarship. His work first brought the site national attention and contributed to archaeologists developing the concept of the Southeastern Ceremonial Complex. One of his many discoveries was a finely carved diorite bowl depicting a crested wood duck. He later donated this work to the Smithsonian Institution, together with more than 500 other pieces.

Although the state had shown little interest in the site, after Moore removed this and many of the site's finest artifacts, the Alabama Legislature passed a law prohibiting people from taking any other artifacts from the state. Archaeological techniques in general were relatively crude when compared to modern standards, but some professionals even during his time criticized Moore for his excavation techniques.

The first large-scale scientific excavations of the site began in 1929 by Walter B. Jones, director of the Alabama Museum of Natural History, and the archaeologist David L. DeJarnette. During the 1930s, Jones used some workers from the Civilian Conservation Corps for excavation as well as stabilization of the mounds. This was a work program developed by the President Franklin D. Roosevelt administration during the Great Depression.

In the early 21st century, work is led by Dr. Jim Knight, Curator of Southeastern Archaeology at the University of Alabama. He is conducting field research at Moundville with an emphasis on ethnohistorical reconstruction. A ceremonial "earth lodge" was discovered in 2007, and about 15 percent of the site has been excavated.

The Jones Archaeological Museum was constructed on the park property in 1939 for display of artifacts collected at the site and interpretation of the ancient peoples and culture. It served as a valuable teaching center for many decades. In the 21st century, the museum was remodeled and equipped with the latest technological improvements in 2010. The University of Alabama maintains an archaeological lab at the park and sponsors summer field seasons and public events.

Ceramics

Two major varieties of pottery are associated with the Moundville site. The Hemphill style pottery is a locally produced ware with a distinctive engraving tradition, and is mostly associated with burial practices. The other variety consists of painted vessels, many of which were not produced locally, which is evidence of trade taking place among other societies outside of the one that lived in Moundville. Unlike the engraved pottery, the negative-painted pottery seems to have been used only by the elites at the Moundville site, as it has not been found outside the site.

Moundville Archaeological Site Human Remains Controversy 
In accordance with the 1990 Native American Graves Protection and Repatriation Act (NAGPRA), institutions such as universities and museums are required to document any discovered human remains and return them to the appropriate indigenous tribes. However, there is debate surrounding if modern tribes have a substantial claim to the human remains found at American excavation sites.

In the case of Moundville, currently 7 tribes are laying claim to the 5,892 human remains that have been excavated there. Those tribes being:

• The Choctaw Nation of Oklahoma

• The Chickasaw Nation

• The Coushatta Tribe of Louisiana

• The Muscogee (also known as the Creek) Nation

• The Alabama-Quassarte Tribal Town

• The Seminole Nation of Oklahoma

• The Seminole Tribe of Florida

All of the tribes claim that they are culturally and/or linguistically descended from the culture that lived in Moundville, since that society predates their own. Therefore, the tribes want to have autonomy of the artifacts and human remains that were excavated in Moundville returned to them, as well where they will then decide what to do with them. Often times, the remains are ceremonially reburied according to the respective tribe's traditions, as many believe that the exhumation of the graves to be unethical and disrespectful. Many institutions fear that returning the human remains to the tribes entails no longer being able to study, but this is not necessarily the case. Rather, the tribes would be in control of what artifacts are studied, as well as be included in those same studies. However, many institutions hold onto the artifacts, claiming that the aforementioned tribes are not culturally and linguistically similar enough to the culture that inhabited Moundville.

Geography
The Moundville Archaeological Site is located on a bluff overlooking the Black Warrior River. The site and other affiliated settlements are located within a portion of the Black Warrior River Valley starting below the fall line, just south of present-day Tuscaloosa, Alabama, and extending  downriver. Below the fall line, the valley widens and the uplands consist of rolling hills dissected by intermittent streams. This region corresponds with the transition between the Piedmont and Coastal Plain and encompasses considerable physiographic and ecological diversity. Environmentally this portion of the Black Warrior Valley was an ecotone that had floral and faunal characteristics from temperate oak-hickory, maritime magnolia, and pine forests.

See also
 Bottle Creek Mounds
 Jere Shine site
 Ocmulgee Mounds National Historical Park 
 Taskigi Mound
 List of National Historic Landmarks in Alabama

References

Further reading
Knight, Vernon James, Jr. Mound Excavations at Moundville: Architecture, Elites, and Social Order (University of Alabama Press; 2010) 404 
Knight, Vernon James, Jr. 2004 "Characterizing Elite Midden Mounds at Moundville", American Antiquity 69(1):304-321.
 Knight, Vernon James, Jr. 1998 "Moundville as a Diagrammatic Ceremonial Center", Archaeology of the Moundville Chiefdom, edited by V.J. Knight Jr. and V.P. Steponaitis, pp. 44–62. Washington: Smithsonian Institution Press.
 Steponaitis, Vincas P. 1983 Ceramics, Chronology, and Community Patterns: An Archaeological Study at Moundville . Academic Press, New York.
 Welch, Paul D. 1991 Moundville's Economy. University of Alabama Press, Tuscaloosa.
 Welch, Paul D., and C. Margaret Scarry. 1995 "Status-related Variation in Foodways in the Moundville Chiefdom", American Antiquity 60:397-419.
 Wilson, Gregory D. 2008 The Archaeology of Everyday Life at Early Moundville, University of Alabama Press, Tuscaloosa.

External links

Moundville Archaeological Park, University of Alabama
Encyclopedia of Alabama article on Moundville

Archaeological sites on the National Register of Historic Places in Alabama
South Appalachian Mississippian culture
Mounds in Alabama
Native American history of Alabama
National Register of Historic Places in Hale County, Alabama
National Historic Landmarks in Alabama
Pre-historic cities in the United States
Protected areas of Hale County, Alabama
Museums in Hale County, Alabama
Archaeological museums in Alabama
Native American museums in Alabama
Parks in Alabama
Protected areas of Tuscaloosa County, Alabama
Archaeological parks
Protected areas established in 1964
1964 establishments in Alabama